Hsu Jen-hao (Chinese: 許仁豪; born 26 October 1991) is a Taiwanese badminton player.

Career 
In 2012, he competed at the London 2012 Olympic Games in the men's singles event, but he did not advance to the next round after being defeated in the group stage by Son Wan-ho of Korea with the score of 21–14, 21-10 and by Vladimir Ivanov of Russia with the score of 21–15, 21–13. He also reached in the semifinal of 2016 French Super Series and was defeated by the champion, Shi Yuqi from China.

Achievements

Summer Universiade 
Men's singles

BWF World Tour (1 runner-up) 
The BWF World Tour, announced on 19 March 2017 and implemented in 2018, is a series of elite badminton tournaments, sanctioned by Badminton World Federation (BWF). The BWF World Tour is divided into six levels, namely World Tour Finals, Super 1000, Super 750, Super 500, Super 300 (part of the HSBC World Tour), and the BWF Tour Super 100.

Men's singles

BWF Grand Prix (1 title, 2 runners-up) 
The BWF Grand Prix has two levels: Grand Prix and Grand Prix Gold. It is a series of badminton tournaments, sanctioned by the Badminton World Federation (BWF) since 2007.

Men's singles

  BWF Grand Prix Gold tournament
  BWF Grand Prix tournament

BWF International Challenge/Series (4 titles, 3 runners-up) 
Men's singles

  BWF International Challenge tournament
  BWF International Series tournament

References

External links 
 

Taiwanese male badminton players
1991 births
Living people
Sportspeople from Taipei
Badminton players at the 2012 Summer Olympics
Olympic badminton players of Taiwan
Badminton players at the 2014 Asian Games
Badminton players at the 2018 Asian Games
Asian Games bronze medalists for Chinese Taipei
Asian Games medalists in badminton
Medalists at the 2014 Asian Games
Medalists at the 2018 Asian Games
Universiade medalists in badminton
Universiade gold medalists for Chinese Taipei
Universiade bronze medalists for Chinese Taipei
Medalists at the 2015 Summer Universiade
Medalists at the 2017 Summer Universiade